Thomas William Bergeson (born 1962) is a retired lieutenant general in the United States Air Force, who last served as the deputy commander of United States Central Command. He was commissioned upon graduating from the United States Air Force Academy in 1985 and retired 1 September 2020.

Awards and decorations

References

Living people
1962 births
United States Air Force generals
Place of birth missing (living people)
United States Air Force Academy alumni